Tang Qianhui (born 10 September 2000) is a Chinese tennis player.

Tang has a career-high singles ranking of world No. 617, achieved on 24 June 2019. She peaked at No. 109 in the doubles rankings on 3 February 2020. Tang has won two doubles titles on the WTA Tour and nine doubles titles on the ITF Women's Circuit.

She won her biggest title to date at the Jiangxi International Open in Nanchang, partnering Jiang Xinyu. The pair defended their title the following year.

WTA career finals

Doubles: 2 (2 titles)

ITF Circuit finals

Doubles: 18 (9 titles, 9 runner–ups)

External links
 
 

2000 births
Living people
Chinese female tennis players
Sportspeople from Chengdu
21st-century Chinese women